Huilong is a town under the administration of Gaoyao City in western Guangdong province, China, situated  southeast of Zhaoqing. , it has one residential community and 16 villages under its administration.

See also
List of township-level divisions of Guangdong

References

Gaoyao
Towns in Guangdong